Lake Tekapo (often known simply as Tekapo to avoid confusion with the lake itself) is a small township located at the southern end of the lake of the same name in the inland South Island of New Zealand. It had 558 residents according to the 2018 census, being one of five settlements in the sparsely populated Mackenzie Basin.

Daily shuttle services link Lake Tekapo to Christchurch and Queenstown. The lake is a popular tourist destination, and several resort hotels are located at the township. Twizel lies 60 km (39 minutes drive) south of Lake Tekapo via Lake Pukaki and Burkes Pass lies 21 km (15 minutes drive) west along State Highway 8.

History
The Māori were the first people to discover the Mackenzie Basin.  The name Tekapo, a misspelling of Takapō, derived from the te reo Māori words taka (sleeping mat) and po (night). Takapō means "To leave in haste at night". 

The Mackenzie Basin became known to Europeans in 1855 when, in order to find a less conspicuous route, James Mackenzie, a Scottish sheep thief, ventured inland and discovered the high country that now bears his name.  In 1857, John and Barbara Hay established the first sheep farm in Mackenzie on the shore of Lake Tekapo.

Lake Tekapo township started to grow after the construction of hydropower stations in the 1940s. Prior to this, the town consisted of "two station homesteads, a private hotel, and several holiday cottages". The project was delayed due to World War II, but it was eventually completed and commissioned in 1951. The control gates built across the outlet of Lake Tekapo regulate the amount of water entering the Tekapo River. These were completed in 1940. State Highway 8 runs across the top of them.

After the completion of the hydroelectric scheme, the town of Lake Tekapo returned to being a small town. Visitor numbers increased in the 1960s with skiers and ice skaters visiting in winter months.
The population declined in the 1980s to a total of 189 residents in 1991. The population increased in the 1990s with the population reaching 294 residents in 1996.  

Tekapo is expected to grow significantly between 2020 and 2050. The MacKenzie District Council expects the district’s population will jump from 4950 to 9050, dwellings 3872 to 6120, jobs 1876 to 4618, and peak day visitors 17,378 to 61,253.

The MacKenzie District Council announced in 2021 that it will start using the dual names of Tekapo and Takapō when referring to Lake Tekapo (Tekapo is an incorrect spelling of Takapō, the Maori name for Lake Tekapo).

Demographics 
It is part of the Mackenzie Lakes statistical area. 

Lake Tekapo had a population of 558 at the 2018 New Zealand census, an increase of 198 people (55.0%) since the 2013 census, and an increase of 240 people (75.5%) since the 2006 census. There were 180 households. There were 273 males and 285 females, giving a sex ratio of 0.96 males per female, with 60 people (10.8%) aged under 15 years, 183 (32.8%) aged 15 to 29, 267 (47.8%) aged 30 to 64, and 48 (8.6%) aged 65 or older.

Ethnicities were 60.2% European/Pākehā, 3.8% Māori, 1.6% Pacific peoples, 31.7% Asian, and 8.1% other ethnicities (totals add to more than 100% since people could identify with multiple ethnicities).

Although some people objected to giving their religion, 58.1% had no religion, 27.4% were Christian, 3.2% were Hindu, 1.6% were Muslim, 2.2% were Buddhist and 2.7% had other religions.

Of those at least 15 years old, 162 (32.5%) people had a bachelor or higher degree, and 33 (6.6%) people had no formal qualifications. The employment status of those at least 15 was that 372 (74.7%) people were employed full-time, and 66 (13.3%) were part-time.

Climate
Lake Tekapo has an oceanic climate (Köppen climate classification: Cfb) with mild, sunny summers and moderately cold winters, with occasional winter snow in the township. On average, Lake Tekapo has 2417 sunshine hours (200 hours more than the New Zealand average) and 78 rain days producing 600 mm rainfall annually.

Attractions

International Dark Sky Reserve 
In June 2012, an area of 430,000 hectares (1,100,000 acres) around Tekapo was declared the Aoraki Mackenzie International Dark Sky Reserve by the International Dark-Sky Association.  At the time of the designation in 2012, the reserve was the largest in the world, and the only reserve of its type in the Southern Hemisphere.

Mount John University Observatory

Selected for its very clear atmosphere, large number of clear sky nights, and relative freedom from light pollution, Mount John University Observatory is located on a small hill to the north of the town, and south of the small Lake Alexandrina. Originally set up by the University of Pennsylvania (looking for a southern hemisphere location), it is now operated by the University of Canterbury. From 1969 to 1982, the United States Air Force had a satellite tracking station adjacent to the observatory.

Star gazing tours 
The Dark Sky Project runs star gazing tours from their award winning observatory building on the foreshore of Lake Tekapo. The Dark Sky Project is jointly owned by founders Hide Ozawa and Graeme Murray, and Ngāi Tahu iwi.  In the New Zealand Tourism Awards 2021, Dark Sky Project won the Māori Tourism award, He Kai Kei Aku Ringa.

The observatory building contains a restored Brashear telescope. It is built of brass, iron, steel and wood and stands nine metres high. It has an 18-inch refracting lens. The Brashear telescope was built in 1894. This telescope was brought to New Zealand in 1963 by the University of Pennsylvania and the University of Canterbury.

Church of the Good Shepherd 

The Church of the Good Shepherd is situated within the township on the shores of Lake Tekapo. It was built in 1935, and was the first church in the Mackenzie Basin. The church was designed by Christchurch architect R.S.D. Harman, based on sketches by a local artist, Esther Hope. The building is a Category 1 listed historic place and is one of the most photographed churches in New Zealand. It features an altar window that frames views of the lake and mountains.

Sheepdog statue 

Close to the Church of the Good Shepherd is a well-known bronze statue of a New Zealand Collie sheepdog. The statue was commissioned by Mackenzie Country residents in recognition of the indispensable role of the sheepdog in their livelihoods. The sculptor was Innes Elliott of Kaikoura, with a dog called Haig, belonging to a neighbour, being the model. Elliott reported the sculpting process took approximately fifteen months. Clay for the model came from the insulator works in Temuka, with a plaster cast of it made and sent to London in 1966, where the statue was cast.

Tekapo Hot Springs 
Tekapo Hot Springs is a tourist attraction located to the north-west of the township, at the base of Mt John. It has three hot pools designed for soaking in, which range in temperature from 36.5 to 38.5 degrees Celsius. These are designed in the shape of Lake Ohau, Lake Pukaki and Lake Tekapo. A further two cooler pools are designed for children and a splash pad is also present. Tekapo Hot Springs also has an ice skating rink and a snow tubing park.

Lake Tekapo foot bridge 

The 125-metre bridge was opened in 2015. This crosses the Tekapo River and connects the Church of the Good Shepherd with the rest of the Lake Tekapo township.

Lake Tekapo Regional Park

Lake Tekapo Regional Park is a recreation area of  located to the east of the township. Access to the park is by foot or bicycle from the Lake Tekapo township or by car from Lilybank Road.

Skiing 

The Roundhill Ski Area is located on the Two Thumb Range overlooking Lake Tekapo. It comprises  of terrain.

Military base
It is used for general military exercises and was used for pre-deployment training of forces being sent to Afghanistan. 

In 1968, a major fire at the military base during winter led to several buildings being burnt to the ground.

It continues to be an important training site for the New Zealand Army for initial field training and battle handling exercises.

In 2016, the New Zealand Government announced that $16 million was going to be spent upgrading the military base. Improvements would include accommodation upgrades, communications, security fencing, extensions to heavy and light vehicle tracks and a new main camp gate.

An unformed road that runs alongside the Tekapo Military base was sold by the Mackenzie District Council to the New Zealand Defence Force in 2021 for $1 in order to address safety concerns of the public getting too close to military training activities such as live firing of weapons.

Government 

Tekapo is part of the Waitaki electorate.  The MacKenzie District Council is responsible for providing local government services to Lake Tekapo.

Education 
Lake Tekapo School is a contributing primary school serving years 1 to 6, with a roll of  students as of  The school opened in 1940.

References

External links

Official Lake Tekapo Tourism Website
Aoraki Mackenzie International Dark Sky Reserve
Tekapo Hot Springs

Mackenzie District
Populated places in Canterbury, New Zealand
Populated lakeshore places in New Zealand